Robert R. M. Carpenter may refer to:
 R. R. M. Carpenter (1877–1949), American executive and member of the board of directors of DuPont
 R. R. M. Carpenter, Jr. (1915–1990), his son, owner of the Philadelphia Phillies
 Ruly Carpenter, son of Robert Jr. and grandson of Robert Sr., owner and team president of the Phillies

See also
Robert Carpenter (disambiguation)
Bobby Carpenter (disambiguation)